A constitutional law, in the Italian legal system, is an Act of Parliament that has the same strength as the Constitution of Italy. This means that in case of conflicts between the Constitution and a constitutional law, the latter normally prevails, according to the legal principle that "a later law repeals an earlier law" (lex posterior derogat priori).

Constitutional laws that alter or abolish portions of the text of the Constitution are also called leggi di revisione costituzionale (laws amending the Constitution). They are equivalent to amendments to the Constitution of other legal systems (e.g., the United States or Ireland).

Procedure 
The Constitution of Italy, as a rigid constitution, overrules other laws and cannot be repealed or amended by them. Article 138 of the Constitution provides for a special procedure for the Parliament to adopt constitutional laws, including laws to amend the Constitution. Compared to other systems with rigid constitutions, the procedure to amend the Constitution of Italy is among the easiest and is a variation of the ordinary legislative procedure.

The ordinary procedure to adopt a law in Italy requires both houses of parliament to approve the law in the same text by a simple majority cast. Constitutional laws start by following the same procedure, but after being approved for the first time, they must be approved by both houses a second time, at least three months later. In the second reading, no new amendments to the bill may be proposed, but the bill must be approved or rejected in its entirety.

The constitutional law needs to be approved by a majority in each house in its second reading. Depending on the results of the second vote, the constitutional law may then follow two different paths:
 If the bill is approved by a qualified majority of two thirds of members in both houses, it can be immediately promulgated by the President of Italy and become law.
 If the bill is approved by a majority of members in each house but less than the two-thirds majority, it must first be published in the Official Gazette, the official journal in which all Italian laws are published. Then, within three months after its publication, a constitutional referendum may be requested by 500,000 voters, five regional councils, or one fifth of the members of either house of parliament. If no constitutional referendum has been requested after the three months have elapsed, the bill can be promulgated and becomes law.

Constitutional referendum 
If a constitutional referendum is requested, the bill must be approved by a majority of votes cast by the whole electorate to become law. No quorum is required and so the referendum turnout has no effect on its validity, unlike in other forms of referendums in Italy.

Four constitutional referendums have ever been held in Italy. In 2001 and 2020, the constitutional laws were approved. In 2006 and 2016, they were rejected.

Limits 
There are limits to the power of Parliament to amend the Constitution. One is established by Article 139 of the Constitution itself: the form of government of Italy, a republic, cannot be amended. That limit was introduced to protect the result of the institutional referendum in 1946 in which Italians voted to abolish the monarchy. That referendum had been held at the same time as the election of the Constituent Assembly of Italy.

The phrase "republican form (of government)" in Article 139 has been interpreted broadly. It is read to mean that the head of state office cannot be hereditary but also the principle of popular sovereignty is encapsulated. In other words, "republic" is interpreted to mean that the Italian Republic is also "democratic".

The Constitutional Court has also stated in multiple judgments (starting with judgments no. 30 and 31 of 1971) that some principles contained in the Constitution are "supreme principles" (principi supremi), which cannot be repealed, even by amending the Constitution. Rights that the Constitution declares to be "inviolable" are examples of those supreme principles.

List 
The following table lists all constitutional laws adopted by Parliament since the coming into effect of the Constitution of 1948, including those that were later rejected in constitutional referendums (marked in red).

A particular category of constitutional laws is the special statutes of the autonomous regions of Italy. Since they are granted special conditions of autonomy, they are exceptions to the ordinary discipline of the Constitution, and special statutes may be adopted and amended only by constitutional laws. Those constitutional laws are marked in yellow in the table below.

Note

See also
Constitution of Italy
Politics of Italy
Regions of Italy
2016 Italian constitutional referendum
2020 Italian constitutional referendum

References

Constitution of Italy
Law of Italy
Government of Italy